Kinshasa Symphony is a German 2010 documentary film.

Synopsis 
Kinshasa, the capital of the Democratic Republic of the Congo, is the third-largest city in Africa with 10 million inhabitants. The film shows how some people living there have managed to forge one of the most complex systems of human cooperation ever invented: a symphony orchestra (Orchestre Symphonique Kimbanguiste) performing composers such as Handel, Verdi, Beethoven. "Kinshasa Symphony" shows Kinshasa in all its diversity, speed, colour, vitality and energy. It is a film about the Congo, about the people of Kinshasa and about music.

Awards 
 New York City 2010
 Vancouver 2010
 Rhode Island 2010

See also
Congo in Four Acts, a documentary anthology film featuring music from the Kinshasa Symphony

References

External links

2010 films
German documentary films
2010 documentary films
Documentary films about classical music and musicians
Culture of Kinshasa
Films set in the Democratic Republic of the Congo
Democratic Republic of the Congo music
Documentary films about African music
2010s German films